Dorothee Janetzke-Wenzel (born 17 July 1953, Minden) is a German diplomat. She was Ambassador of the Federal Republic of Germany in various countries between 2008 and 2019, most recently in Myanmar.

Life 
From  1975 to 1979, she studied applied linguistics and development economics at the Heidelberg University; from 1980 to 1982, she studied African studies at the University of Wisconsin-Madison. From 1983 to 1984, she taught English. and worked in the international office of the University of Mannheim .

In 1984 Janetzke-Wenzel joined the Federal Foreign Office. She completed the career test in 1986, and initially worked in the departments of human rights, the United Nations and the crisis response center. From 1987 to 1992 she worked at the Embassy in Dar es Salaam and Vienna, and from 1995 to 1998, at the Embassy in Washington, D.C. From 1998, she worked in the Berlin in the areas of international university relations. From 2001 to 2004, she was the head of the personnel department for the civil service. From 2004 to 2007, she was Director for African Affairs at the Federal Foreign Office. From 2007, she was a guest lecturer at Andrássy University Budapest.

From 2008 to 2011, she was ambassador to Hungary. From 2011 to July 2014, she was ambassador to Nigeria, until she was replaced by Michael Peter Zenner.

She became ambassador to Finland in 2014, succeeding Thomas Götz, who in turn became ambassador to Slovakia. From 2017 to 2019, she was anbassador to Myanmar. Her successor in Myanmar was Thomas Karl Neisinger.

References

External links 

 STATE COUNSELLOR RECEIVES AMBASSADOR OF FEDERAL REPUBLIC OF GERMANY (mebandarseribegawan.org)

1953 births
Heidelberg University alumni
University of Wisconsin–Madison alumni
German women ambassadors
Ambassadors to Myanmar
Ambassadors of Germany to Finland
Ambassadors of Germany to Hungary
Living people